Robert Cunningham may refer to:
 Robert Cunningham (entrepreneur) (1837–1905), Canadian lay missionary, entrepreneur and founder of Port Essington, British Columbia
 Robert Cunningham (politician) (1836–1874), Canadian journalist and Member of Parliament
 Robert J. Cunningham (born 1943), Roman Catholic bishop
 Robert K. Cunningham (born 1963), American engineer
 Robert Oliver Cunningham (1841–1918), Scottish naturalist
 Steve Cunningham (computer scientist) (Robert Stephen Cunningham, born 1942), American computer scientist
 Robert M. Cunningham (1919–2008), American meteorologist
 Sir Robert Cunningham, several of the Cunningham baronets
 Robert Roy Cunningham (1876–1958), member of the California legislature
 Robert Cunningham (minister) (died 1637), Scottish minister who settled in Ulster

See also
 Robert Bontine Cunninghame Graham (1852–1936), Scottish politician, writer, journalist and adventurer
Bob Cunningham (disambiguation)